Luca Rigoni (born 7 December 1984) is an Italian former footballer. He is the elder brother of Nicola Rigoni. He played as a right or central midfielder.

Career

Vicenza
Born in Schio, Province of Vicenza, Veneto, Rigoni started his career at hometown club Vicenza. He played his first league match on 24 May 2003 against Cagliari Calcio, on the 35th matchday, towards the end of the Serie B season. In the 2003–04 season he became one of the members of the first team, playing 31 league matches.

Reggina
After the club almost relegated to Serie C1 in 2005, Rigoni along with Davide Biondini were sold to Serie A struggler Reggina (in a co-ownership deal for €900,000 and €500,000 respectively; Ricardo Esteves moved to Vicenza for €500,000). However Rigoni failed to enter the first team. He was loaned back to Serie B for Piacenza in mid-season. Circa January Reggina also acquired Biondini outright for another €700,000, with Simone Cavalli moved to Vicenza for €775,000.

Vicenza return
In June 2006 Vicenza bought back Rigoni for €1 million (with and Esteves moved back to Reggina for the same fee) He was offered a new four-year contract which last until 30 June 2010. Since returned to Vicenza, he became the regular starter, but in January 2008, he moved to Chievo in another co-ownership deal, for €1 million (€850,000 plus 50% registration rights of Mattia Marchesetti).

Chievo
With Chievo, Rigoni made only 3 starts in 11 appearances in the first season, He followed the team promoted to Serie A, and played regularly since January 2009, replacing Vincenzo Italiano as starting central midfielder.

In June 2009 Chievo bought the remain 50% registration rights from Vicenza, for another €1 million, but in terms of Giacomo Di Donato's registration rights. Rigoni was the absolute starter of the Veronese in 2009–10 season. But due to muscle problem, he missed nearly 2 months and was replaced by Manuel Iori.

In January 2010, he fractured his nose during training, but he already disqualified for the next match after receiving a yellow card on 24 January 2010. He was suspended again on round 26 and rested on round 27. On round 33, he was suspended again. He was rested again against Roma in the last round.

At the start of 2010–11 season, with gialloblu having offered contract extensions to several players, including Luciano and Squizzi, Rigoni signed a new five-year contract on 11 August.

Palermo
On 25 July 2014, Palermo announced to have completed the permanent signing of Rigoni on a three-year deal.

Genoa
On 28 December 2015, Rigoni was signed by Genoa C.F.C., effective on the opening of January 2016 transfer window.

Parma
On 18 July 2018, Rigoni signed to Serie A side Parma a one-year contract with an option for a second one.

Once again back to Vicenza
On 2 September 2019, Rigoni return to Serie C club Vicenza after 11 years. On 8 February 2022, Rigoni announced his retirement from playing.

Career statistics

Club

Honours
Chievo
Serie B: 2007–08

References

External links
Profile at Football.it 
Profile at La Gazzeta dello Sport 
Profile at Chievo 
Profile at FIGC 

Living people
1984 births
People from Schio
Association football midfielders
Italian footballers
Italy youth international footballers
L.R. Vicenza players
Reggina 1914 players
Piacenza Calcio 1919 players
A.C. ChievoVerona players
Palermo F.C. players
Genoa C.F.C. players
Parma Calcio 1913 players
Serie A players
Serie B players
Sportspeople from the Province of Vicenza
Footballers from Veneto